In the medieval Serbian states, the privileged class consisted of nobility and clergy, distinguished from commoners, part of the feudal society. The Serbian nobility (srpska vlastela, srpsko vlastelinstvo or srpsko plemstvo) were roughly grouped into magnates (velikaši or velmože), the upper stratum, and the lesser nobility (vlasteličići). Serbia followed the government model established by the Byzantine Empire.

The nobility possessed hereditary allodial estates, which were worked by dependent sebri, the equivalent of Byzantine paroikoi; peasants owing labour services, formally bound by decree. The nobility was obliged to serve the monarch in war.

Hierarchy

The nobility (vlastela, vlastelinstvo or plemstvo) of Serbia in the Middle Ages is roughly divided into magnates (velikaši or velmože), nobility and petty noblemen (vlasteličići). Sometimes, the division is made between vlastela (including "great" and "small" ones) and vlasteličići, the petty nobility. The lower-half social class, commoners, were the sebri (себри).

The velikaši (великаши) were the highest nobility class of Serbia.
The vlasteličići (властеличићи) were the lower nobility class of Serbia. It was a relatively numerous class of the small, warrior nobility, originating from the vojnici (warriors) from sources from the end of the 12th and the beginning of the 13th century. They held villages, with full rights, and in socioeconomic and legal terms stood below the vlastela. They had military obligations, such as the vlasteličić joining the army individually or with a group of his men (soldiers), dependent on his wealth.

Titles

History

Early Medieval Serbian principalities
The Serbs at that time were organized into župe (sing. župa), a confederation of village communities (roughly the equivalent of a county), headed by a local župan (a magistrate or governor); the governorship was hereditary, and the župan reported to the Serbian prince, whom they were obliged to aid in war.

According to Fine Jr.: Bosnia, Zahumlje and Rascia were never incorporated into an integrated state with Duklja (1043–1101); each principality had its own nobility and institutions, simply requiring a member of the royal family to rule as Prince or Duke. After Constantine Bodin died, the principalities seceded from Duklja, and Vukan became the most powerful Serb ruler, as Grand Prince. Subordinate to the ruler were local counts who seem to have been more or less autonomous in the internal affairs of their counties, but who swore loyalty and were obliged to support in war. It seems that the counts were hereditary holders of their counties, holding their land before Duklja annexed Rascia.

Serbian Kingdom

The hierarchy of the Serbian court titles was the following: stavilac, čelnik, kaznac, tepčija and vojvoda, the supreme title.

In the Dečani chrysobulls, King Stefan Dečanski (r. 1321–1331) mentioned that the court dignitaries present at the Dečani assembly were the kaznac, tepčija, vojvoda, sluga and stavilac.

Serbian Empire

On April 16, 1346 (Easter), Stephen Uroš IV Dušan of Serbia convoked a huge assembly at Skopje, attended by the Serbian Archbishop Joanikije II, the Archbishop of Ochrid Nikolaj I, the Bulgarian Patriarch Simeon and various religious leaders of Mount Athos. The assembly and clerics agreed on, and then ceremonially performed the raising of the autocephalous Serbian Archbishopric to the status of Serbian Patriarchate. The Archbishop from now on is titled Serbian Patriarch, although some documents called him Patriarch of Serbs and Greeks, with the seat at the Patriarchal Monastery of Peć. The first Serbian Patriarch Joanikije II now solemnly crowned Dušan as "Emperor and autocrat of Serbs and Romans" (Greek ). Dušan had his son crowned King of Serbs and Greeks, giving him nominal rule over the Serbian lands, and although Dušan was governing the whole state, he had special responsibility for the "Roman", i.e. Greek lands.

A further increase in the Byzantinization of the Serbian court followed, particularly in court ceremonial and titles. As Emperor, Dušan could grant titles only possible as an Emperor. In the years that followed, Dušan's half-brother Symeon Uroš and brother-in-law Jovan Asen became despotes. Jovan Oliver already had the despot title, granted to him by Andronikos III. His brother-in-law Dejan Dragaš and Branko is granted the title of sebastocrator. The military commanders (voivodes) Preljub and Vojihna receive the title of caesar. The raising of the Serbian Patriarch resulted in the same spirit, bishoprics became metropolitans, as for example the Metropolitanate of Skopje.

Fall of the Serbian Empire 

Emperor Uroš V died childless in December 2/4 1371, after much of the Serbian nobility had been destroyed in Maritsa earlier that year. This marked an end to the once powerful Empire.  Vukašin's son Marko, who had earlier been crowned Young King was to inherit his father's royal title, and thus became one in the line of successors to the Serbian throne. Meanwhile, the nobles pursued their own interests, sometimes quarreling with each other.  Serbia, without an Emperor "became a conglomerate of aristocratic territories", and the Empire was thus divided between the provincial lords: Marko, the Dejanović brothers, Đurađ I Balšić, Vuk Branković, Nikola Altomanović, Lazar Hrebeljanović and other lesser ones.

List of nobility

Early medieval Serbian principalities (9th century–1100) 
Beloje, Lord of Trebinje (before 847)
Krajina Belojević, Duke of Travunia (after 847)
Hvalimir Belojević, Duke of Travunia (late 9th century)
Čučimir Belojević, Duke of Travunia (first half of 10th century)
Draško, Duke of Narentines (fl. 836–839)
Ljudislav, Duke of Narentines (ca. 840)
Uneslaf and Diodur, Duke of Narentines (after 840)
Peter, archon  of Diokleia (10th- or 11th century)
John, protospatharios and katepano of Ras (fl. 971-976)
Ljutovid, protospatharios epi tou Chrysotriklinou, hypatos, strategos of Serbia and Zahumlje (fl. 1039-1042)
Domanek, Duke of Travunia (fl. 1054-1055)
Petrilo (fl. 1072), vojvoda 
Stefan, Duke of Bosnia (fl. 1081-1101)

Serbian Grand Principality (1100–1217)
Grdeša (fl. 1154–56), župan of Trebinje
Vučina (fl. 1150–51), župan 
Radomir (fl. 1170), župan in Trebinje 
Slavogast (fl. 1154–56), ban of Hum 
Hramko, Lord of provinces in Hum (ca 1177–1200)
Svergius (?), župan 
Đura (fl. 1186), satnik (stotnik), Stefan Nemanja's delegate in the city of Kotor

Serbian Kingdom (1217–1345)
Obrad ( 1230s), veliki tepčija, served Stefan Vladislav
Manojlo (fl. 1237), vojvoda (duke), served king Vladislav, mentioned in king's charter to noblemen of Split
Pribilša, župan, son of Grdeša, "died in the time of Stefan Vladislav".
Bogdan Radojević (fl. 1278), kaznac.
several (small) nobles from charter of prince Andrija of Hum in 1240. - Hrelko Rastomirić, Dobrovit Radovčić, Hrelja Stepković, Odumisl i Strezimir Adamović, Čepren Osilić, Hranislav Prvoslavić, Bigren Mrđić, Dobromisl Pobratović, Desin Berivojević, Radovan Pribidružić, Hrelja Desavčić, Pribin Zlošević, Toma Čupetić, Galic Vuksanić, Hrelja Hranidružić, Predislav Vukmirić, Vojmir Vlastinić, Bogdan Dobromirić, Hrvatin Turbić, Prvoslav Prodančić, Bratoslav Vuković, Berko Radovančić
Vlado, kaznac, served between 1274 and 1279
Prvoslav Radojević (fl. 1280), kaznac, served Helen of Anjou.
Mrnjan (fl. 1288), kaznac, served Helen of Anjou at the court at Trebinje
Miroslav, kaznac, served Stefan Milutin
Kuzma (fl. 1306), tepčija, served Stefan Milutin.
Branko, čelnik, served Stefan Milutin.
Vladislav Jonima (fl. 1303–19), župan (fl. 1306), served Stefan Milutin in northern Albania (fl. 1303–06).
Dražen Bogopenec (fl. 1306–07), župan, served Stefan Milutin in eastern Hum.
Hardomil, tepčija (1306–1321), served Stefan Milutin.
Novak Grebostrek (fl. 1312), veliki vojvoda. fought at Gallipoli
Jovan Dragoslav (fl. 1290–1315), kaznac (fl. 1300), veliki kaznac (fl. 1315), serving Stefan Milutin. Founder of Church of Virgin Hodegetria.
Brajko/Bradko (fl. 1319)
Mišljen, veliki tepčija, served Stefan Dečanski.
Radosav, tepčija, served Stefan Dečanski.
Ilija, kefalija (before 1326)
Vukdrag (d. 1327), čelnik. took monastic vows as Nikola
Baldovin, knez. Governed Vranje during Stefan Dečanski. Bagaš noble family.
Mladen (fl. 1323–26), vojvoda. Branković family ancestor.
Ružir (fl. 1336), vojvoda.
Nikola (fl. 1321-1329), župan. Governed northern Albania, younger brother of Mladen.
Petar Brajan, (fl. 1340–42), župan.
Đuraš Vrančić, stavilac.
Miloš Vojinović (fl. 1333), stavilac. son of Vojin
Hrelja, vojvoda, Governed Rila (fl. ca. 1320s-1342)
Vojin, vojvoda, Governed Gacko (fl. 1322-1347)
Vladoje (fl. 1326), tepčija. 
Mrnjava, provincial lord (fl. 1329)
Bogoje, Lord of province in Zeta (fl. 1340)
Ivan Dragušin (fl. 1325–40). Dušan's maternal cousin.
Jovan and Radoslav, sons of vojvoda Dejan (Manjak?) and Vladislava 
Milten Draživojević (fl. 1332–43), župan, served Stefan Dušan.
Vratko Čihorić (fl. 1335), župan.

Serbian Empire (1345–1371)
Jovan Oliver (fl. 1331–56), veliki vojvoda, sevastokrator and despot. Governed Štip and Strumica.
Dejan (fl. 1346–66), vojvoda, sevastokrator and despot. Governed province between Kumanovo and Velbazhd.
Branko Mladenović, sevastokrator. Governed Ohrid. Son of Mladen.
Vukašin (d. 1371), vojvoda, despot, king, Governed Prilep. Son of Mrnjava.
Preljub (d. 1356), vojvoda, caesar. Governed Thessaly (1348–1356).
Simeon Uroš (d. 1370), despot. Governed Epirus (1359–1366), and Thessaly (1359–1370). Nemanjić.
Ivaniš (fl. 1348), despot, ruled a region in Toplica.
Voihna (d. ca 1360), vojvoda, caesar. Governed Drama.
Grgur (fl. 1361), vojvoda, caesar. Governed Polog. 
Branko Rastislalić (d. 1352), vojvoda, domestikos. Governed Podunavlje.
Nikola Radonja (d. 1399),caesar. Estate in Serres. Son of Branko Mladenović.
Vratko (fl. 1331–47), vojvoda. Governed Prokuplje. Nemanjić.
Radoslav Hlapen, vojvoda. Governed Veria, Voden and Kastoria.
Đuraš Ilijić (d. 1356), čelnik. Governed Upper Zeta. Son of Ilija.
Vlatko Paskačić (fl. 1365), sevastokrator. Governed Slavište. Son of Paskač.
Palman, knight, bodyguard and mercenary commander.
Vojin (fl. 1322-1347), vojvoda. Governed Gacko.
Bogut (fl. 1331), vojvoda. Governed Ugljevik.
Vuk Kosača (d. 1359), vojvoda. Governed Rogatica.
Nikola Bagaš (fl. 1354–85), gospodar. Governed Edessa and Trikala.
Lazar Hrebeljanović (d. 1389), stavilac. Son of Pribac.
Pribac (fl. 1346), logotet, veliki sluga.
Bogdan (fl. 1363), kaznac in the service of Emperor Uroš V
Thomas Preljubović, despot. Governed Ioannina. Son of Preljub.
Altoman (fl. 1335–59), veliki župan. Son of Vojin.
Maljušat, župan. Governed Vranje. Son of Baldovin.
Pribil (fl. 1370s), župan.
Novak (fl. 1369), kesar. Governed Lake Prespa.
Mladen Vladojević (fl. 1348).
Tolislav, kaznac
Dabiživ Čihorić (fl. 1334–d. 1362), sluga (1343–62). Governed Trebinje and Konavle (1330s–1346).
Stepko Čihorić (fl. 1334–69), tepčija.
Nenac Čihorić (fl. 1336–75), župan.
Đurađ Balšić (d. 1378), gospodar. Governed Zeta.
Jovan Dragaš, despot. Governed Kumanovo (d. 1378, son of vojvoda Dejan)
Jeremias Chranislav, archon of the Diocese of Stagi (fl. 1355)
Michael, archon of Prosek (fl. 1342)
Đorđe Ostouša Peklal (d. 1377), monastic vows as Jefrem. Relative of Jovan Oliver. 
Jovan Prosenik ( 1350–60), sevast. 
 Musa, čelnik, member of Musić family
 Čuljko veliki vlastodržac ( 1376), nobleman at Tsar Dušan's court

Fall of the Serbian Empire (1371–1395)
Milutin (d. 1389), vojvoda. Governed Rudnik.
Radič Crnojević (fl. 1392–96), gospodar. Estates in Upper Zeta.
Bratoslav (fl. 1370), logotet.
Dragoslav (fl. 1357-1360), logotet.
Uglješa Vlatković (fl. 1427), kesar. Governed Slavište.
Dabiživ Spandulj (fl. 1375–76), kefalija. Governed Strumica. Served Dejanović brothers.
Žarko Merešić and Mihajlo Davidović (d. 1371).
Stefan Musić and Lazar Musić. Sons of Musa.

Lazar of Serbia
Crep (fl. 1380), vojvoda. Governed Paraćin. Son of Vukoslav.
Vitomir (fl. 1380), vojvoda.
Grubac (fl. 1377), protovestijar.
Nenad(a) (fl. 1372–87), logotet. Son of kaznac Bogdan.
Petar (fl. 1387), župan
Miho (fl. 1387), čelnik
Gojislav (fl. 1387), kefalija. Served Lazar. Governed Novo Brdo.
Ljudina Bogosav (fl. 1381). Governor of Smederevo.
Desivoje (fl. 1380).
Detoš (before 1389). Governed Dragobilj.
Dragoslav Veter (before 1389). Lord of Sinji Vir.
Dragosav Probiščić, vojvoda. Unknown in history.
Vlatko Vlađević. Unknown in history.
Ivaniš Ivanišević. Grandson of Ivaniš.
Jugda (fl. 1381)
Krajmir or Krajko (d. 1389), vojvoda. Son of Jovan Oliver.
Novak (fl. 1381), logotet.
Obrad Dragogaljić (fl. 1387) 
Ognjan (fl. 1381).
Petar Vojinović 
Uglješa Desisalić (d. 1394)

Vuk Branković
Branislav, treasurer
Todor, son of Žegar, nobleman
Todor Hamirović, nobleman
Smil, čelnik
Stefan, logothete
Dragosav, nobleman

Mrnjavčević brothers

logothete Gojko Mrnjavčević. Served Mrnjavčević.
logothete Dabiživ,. Served Mrnjavčević.
logothete Kosan,. Served Mrnjavčević.
čelnik Manko. Served Mrnjavčević.
čelnik Ivoje. Served Mrnjavčević.
čelnik Stanislav. Served Mrnjavčević.
čelnik Milan/Miljan. Served Mrnjavčević.
kefalija Miloš. Served Mrnjavčević.
Radoslav Sablja
kefalija Oliver, of Bitola. Served Mrnjavčević.
Ostoja Rajaković, around Ohrid
kefalija Georgije, brother of protostrator Staniša
Georgije Isaris, under Dušan and Uglješa
veliki čauš Kardamis, member of the higher law-court in Serres
Grgur

Serbian Despotate (1402–1540)
Stefan Lazarević 
Hrebeljan (fl. 1399), čelnik.
Radič (fl. 1413–41), čelnik.
Mazarek (fl. 1414–23), vojvoda. Governor of Rudnik and Ostrovica (1414–?), and Zeta (1422–1423)
Logosit (fl. 1422), vojvoda.
Bogdan (fl. 1408), protovestijar. Served Despot Stefan Lazarević. ktetor of Kalenić.
Petar, brother of Bogdan. 
Mihailo (fl. 1398–1413), vojvoda.
Nikola Zojić and Novak Belocrkvić (fl. 1398). conspiracists.
Mladen Psisin (fl. 1405). Holder of Jabučje.
Radoslav Mihaljević, veliki vojvoda
Mihal, nobleman, from Parakinov Brod
Vukašin (fl. 1399), treasurer
Šainac (fl. 1399), nobleman
Miltoš (fl. 1402), vojvoda
Ivan, treasurer, from Novo Brdo
Vuk, čelnik
Vitan, čelnik
Petar (fl. 1405), kefalija
Tuba (fl. 1402), kefalija of Novo Brdo
Vladislav, vojvoda (duke) in the vicinity of Užice
Novak Karaljuk (fl. 1404-1410), nobleman
Nikola Dorjenović (fl. 1425), nobleman, founder of Nikolje monastery
Ivčin Hodanović, emissary to city of Dubrovnik
Đurađ Zubrović, nobleman
Vlatko (fl. 1422), vojvoda (duke), emissary to Venice on behalf of despot Stefan

Despot Đurađ Branković
Paskoje Sorkočević, čelnik riznički
Damjan Đurđević, from Dubrovnik, counselor
Aloviz Rastić, from Dubrovnik, counselor
Nikola de Arhilupus, from Kotor, counselor
Nikola Rodop, treasurer
Stefan and Jovan Rodop (both fl. 1441), noblemen, brothers, possibly sons of Nikola Rodop
Andrija Humoj (fl. 1422), fortress of Baleč
Kalojan Rusota, counselor, nobleman from Greece
Mihailo Mihaljević, nobleman, brother of Radoslav Mihaljević
Vitomir (fl. 1435), vojvoda (duke), negotiator with Venetians on behalf of despot Đurađ.
Nikša (fl. 1435), cancellarium, mentioned in despot Đurađ's peace treaty with Venice (1435)
Altoman, vojvoda (duke), warfare in Zeta
Jeremija (fl. 1428), vojvoda (duke), fortress of Golubac
Mihal (fl. 1445), veliki čelnik
Thomas Kantakouzenos
Janja Kantakouzenos
Dimitrije Kantakuzin
Radič (fl. 1413–41), veliki čelnik.
Jakša (fl. 1453), vojvoda
Đurađ Golemović, nobleman
Oliver (Olko) Golemović (fl. 1448), kefalija of Priština
Miljen (fl. 1405), čelnik
Stefan (fl. 1405), čelnik
Divko Zaulović, nobleman from Drivast
Junc, nobleman from Dečani
Vukašin, nobleman from Paštrovići area, known to be a subject of despot after conflict with Venetians in Zeta
Stefan Belmužević (fl. 1448), nobleman
Miloš Belmužević (fl. 1453), vojvoda (duke), defender of Medun fortress in Upper Zeta 
Novak Pavlović (fl. 1417), emissary of Đurađ Branković to city of Dubrovnik.
Mihajlo Nikolić (fl. 1415), courier of Đurađ Branković in Dubrovnik.
Radoman from Trepča, emissary of Đurađ Branković in Dubrovnik
Vojin Juga (fl. 1423), vojvoda (duke), present during peace talks with Venetians in Zeta
Radoje Jezdrović (fl. 1414), court clerk of despot Đurađ
Bogosav "Kruška" (fl. 1406), nobleman of Branković family, emissary in Dubrovnik
Novak (fl. 1423), vojvoda (duke)
Lukač (fl. 1405-1426), vojvoda (duke), witness on peace treaty between despot Đurađ and Venetian emissary F.Quirin
Mrkša (fl. 1426), vojvoda (duke)
Andrija Angelović (fl. 1442), ally of despot Đurađ Branković during siege of Drivast.
Manojlo Radić (fl. 1446), vojvoda (duke), trustee of Đurađ Branković in his correspondence with city of Dubrovnik.
Voihna, logothete of despot Đurađ
Dmitar Radojević (fl. 1455), čelnik, active in war against Bosnian kingdom
Dmitar Krajković (fl. 1450), grand čelnik
Stojko Gizdavić (fl. 1444), vojvoda (duke), negotiator of despot Đurađ during peace talks with Turks in Edirne in June 1444
Junije (Džono) Gradić, from Dubrovnik, counselor of despot Đurađ
Komnen, vojvoda (duke), despot Đurađ's commander in Zeta
Vuk Biomužević (fl. 1450), vojvoda (duke), despot's commander in Luštica
Radič Bogdašić (fl. 1435), nobleman, one of the witnesses on peace treaty with Venetian Republic
Radisav Zančić (fl. 1433), nobleman in Srebrenica
Branko Zančić (fl. 1433), nobleman, brother of Radisav, despot's official
Radič (fl. 1436), vojvoda (duke) of Srebrenica
Vukosav Govedinić (fl. 1450-1456), vojvoda (duke) of Smederevo
Petar Kovačević Dinjičić, vojvoda (duke) of Srebrenica, ally of despot Đurađ in 1443.
Bogavac Milaković, nobleman, entourage of Kantakuzina Branković
Pavle Mikšić, nobleman, entourage of Kantakuzina (Katarina) Branković when married to Ulrich II of Celje
Bezubica (fl. 1431), despot Đurađ's ambassador to Ottoman court in Edirne
Nikola Vitomirović, nobleman
Novak Naselorić (fl. 1428), in service of grand čelnik Radič
Dragić Ruparić (fl. 1430), nobleman, despot's negotiator during War of Konavle
Nikola Ptičić (fl. 1439), despot's emissary from Novo Brdo to Hungarian court
Petar Span (fl. 1441), nobleman in despot's entourage during exile in Dubrovnik in 1441.
Lješ (Aleksa) Span (fl. 1446), vojvoda of Novo Brdo, son of Peter, also in despot's service. Had two brothers Božidar and Hrvoje.
Radič Kužević (fl. 1446), vojvoda, member of despot Đurađ's embassy to welcome his future daughter-in-law Jelena Paleolog
Radoje Tvrtković (fl. 1446), vojvoda, also present on Jelena Paleolog's arrival in Dubrovnik
Ivan (fl. 1446), despot's negotiator during peace talks between Dubrovnik and herceg Stjepan Vukčić Kosača
Oliver (fl. 1451), ambassador in Dubrovnik
Vukosav Dobrojević (fl. 1450), kefalija of Trepča
Nikola Radulinović (fl. 1445-1459), merchant from Dubrovnik, despot Đurađ's trustee on several occasions
Brajan (fl. 1453), vojvoda of Srebrenica
Grgur Vlah, vojvoda Nikola and čelnik Radoslav, despot's witnesses when mine Rudište near Belgrade was granted to Janos Hunyadi in 1453.
Vukašin Lipić (fl. 1443), court man of despot Đurađ
Đuro Srdić (fl. 1443), court member
Bratić (fl. 1441), court member
Petar (fl. 1417), vojvoda (duke)
Bogdan Zlokunić (fl. 1444), counselor
Vladislav (fl. 1429), vojvoda, holder of "Seel" estate in the vicinity of Kovin
Mihailo (fl. 1439), vojvoda, also holder of "Seel" estate in the vicinity of Kovin
Nikola Skobaljić (fl. 1454), vojvoda. Lord of Zelen-grad.
Gojčin Crnojević (fl. 1444–51).
Stefan Ratković (fl. 1450-1458), veliki logotet.
Mihailo Anđelović (fl. 1458), veliki čelnik
Marko Altomanović (fl. 1457), vojvoda (duke)
Hrnjko, vojvoda (duke) in fortress of Novo Brdo
Prijezda (fl. 1438), vojvoda (duke) in Novo Brdo
Oliver Kosijer, knez (comes) in Rudnik
Despot Lazar Branković
Stefan Zahić (fl. 1457), court man of despot Lazar Branković
Paskoje Ćeljubinović (fl. 1457-1459), trustee of despot Lazar
Radoslav (fl. 1457), treasurer
Despot Stefan Branković
Bogdan Čokeša (fl. 1458), nobleman

See also
 Serbian noble titles in the Middle Ages
 Sebri, lower-half social class, commoners, in the medieval Serbian state

References

Sources

Further reading
Blagojević, M. "Vladar i podanici, vlastela i vojnici, zavisni ljudi i trgovci." Rulers and subjects, lords and soldiers, dependent people and traders). In Cirkovic (ed.): 141-156.
 
Иванић, Б. "Прстење српске средњовековне властеле." (1998).
 
 
 
Острогорски, Георгије. "Душан и његова властела у борби са Византијом." Зборник у част шесте стогодишњице Законика цара Душана 1 (1951): 79-86.
 
 
 
Topalović, Živko, and Marko Milutinović-Piper. Sebri i vlastela: društveni poredak u staroj srpskoj državi. Srpska književna zadruga, 2002.

 
 
Medieval Serbian state
Nobility
Feudalism in Serbia